The Bridgewater–Raritan Regional School District is a regional public school district serving students in pre-kindergarten through twelfth grade from the municipalities of Bridgewater Township and Raritan Borough in Somerset County, New Jersey, United States. All of the school facilities are in Bridgewater, except for John F. Kennedy School, which is located in Raritan.

As of the 2020–21 school year, the district, comprised of 11 schools, had an enrollment of 8,254 students and 754.4 classroom teachers (on an FTE basis), for a student–teacher ratio of 10.9:1. One of the largest suburban districts statewide, the district is the largest in Somerset County.

The district is classified by the New Jersey Department of Education as being in District Factor Group "I", the second-highest of eight groupings. District Factor Groups organize districts statewide to allow comparison by common socioeconomic characteristics of the local districts. From lowest socioeconomic status to highest, the categories are A, B, CD, DE, FG, GH, I and J.

Awards and recognition
During the 1999–2000 school year, Bridgewater–Raritan High School received the National Blue Ribbon Award of Excellence from the United States Department of Education, the highest honor that an American school can achieve.

For the 1997-98 school year, Bridgewater–Raritan High School was named a "Star School" by the New Jersey Department of Education, the highest honor that a New Jersey school can achieve.

BRHS is one of only three high schools in the state to have received both awards.

Bridgewater Middle school students qualified to participate in NJ State and National Mathcounts for 2012 and 2013.

Bridgewater Middle School students placed first in the National Science Bowl 2013 New Jersey regional competition held at Princeton Plasma Lab; Science Bowl is a science competition sponsored by United States Department of Energy, involving general, physical, life, earth and mathematics.

The Bridgewater Middle School Academic team won the A.T.O.M.S tournament for six of eight years, in 2010, 2011, 2012, 2013, 2015 and 2017.

In 2015, BRMS swept all of the 30+ schools during the Music in the Parks Festival and came in first in Jazz band, wind ensemble, orchestra, and girls choir.

In 2013, the BRHS marching band placed the highest of any New Jersey marching band at the Bands of America national championships, and the second New Jersey band to make it to semi-finals.

Schools
Schools in the district (with 2020–21 enrollment data from the National Center for Education Statistics) are:

Primary schools
Adamsville Primary School (532 students; in grades PreK–4)
James Singagliese, Principal
Bradley Gardens Primary School (263; PreK–4)
Barbara A. Binford, Principal
Crim Primary School (342; K–4)
Kelliann Ten Kate, Principal
Hamilton Primary School (477; K–4)
Timothy Beaumont, Principal
John F. Kennedy Primary School (427; K–4)
Joseph T. Walsh, Principal
Milltown Primary School (402; PreK–4)
Matthew J. Lembo, Principal
Van Holten Primary School (334; K–4)
George Rauh, Principal
Intermediate and middle schools
Eisenhower Intermediate School (704; 5–6)
Joseph P. Diskin, Principal
Hillside Intermediate School (574; 5–6)
Dr. Tali Axelrod, Principal
Bridgewater–Raritan Middle School (1,384; 7–8)
Megan Corliss, Principal
High school
Bridgewater–Raritan High School (2,747; 9–12)
Chris Steffner, Principal

Former and converted schools
From the early 1960s to the early 1990s, the Bridgewater–Raritan district had two high schools, known as "East" and "West."  The current unified high school is on the "West" site, and the former "East" building is now the Middle School.

Schools that have been closed since the 1980s include:
Valley School (now the Harmon V. Wade Administration Building, school district headquarters)
Finderne School (now the Peoplecare Center for non-profit community services)
Green Knoll School (now part of the Bridgewater Township Municipal Building complex)
Martinsville School (now occupied by private offices)
Washington Middle School in Raritan (converted to Somerset County offices)

Adamsville School, now an elementary school, was a middle school until the 1980s.  Eisenhower and Hillside Schools, now intermediate schools, were both middle schools until 1995.

District governance

Administration
Core members of the district's administration are:
Robert Beers, Superintendent
Peter Starrs, Business Administrator / Board Secretary

Board of Education
The district's board of education is comprised of nine members who set policy and oversee the fiscal and educational operation of the district through its administration. As a Type II school district, the board's trustees are elected directly by voters to serve three-year terms of office on a staggered basis, with either one or two seats up for election each year held (since 2012) as part of the November general election. The board appoints a superintendent to oversee the district's day-to-day operations and a business administrator to supervise the business functions of the district. The district's nine-member Board of Education is apportioned by population between Bridgewater and Raritan.  Since the early 1990s, Bridgewater has elected eight of the board members and Raritan has elected one. Board members serve three-year terms of office on a staggered basis, with three members up for election each year. For 2022, the board president is Steven Singer and the vice president is Lynne Hurley, both of Bridgewater.

References

External links 
Bridgewater-Raritan Regional School District

School Data for the Bridgewater-Raritan Regional School District, National Center for Education Statistics

Bridgewater Township, New Jersey
Raritan, New Jersey
New Jersey District Factor Group I
School districts in Somerset County, New Jersey